Heinrich Karl Ernst Martin Meyer (17 May 1904, Nuremberg, Germany – 10 October 1977, Bellingham, Washington) was a German professor and writer. He first moved to the United States to work at Rice University in 1930 and became a naturalized citizen on 6 November 1935. In 1942 a petition was submitted to revoke his citizenship due to his national German sympathies, and the case was fought in courts until ultimately he was allowed to retain his American citizenship in 1944. Over the next three decades, Meyer wrote extensively about German literature and about American Culture, but also published on gardening under pseudonym John Anderson, Robert O. Barlow, Hugo Cartesius und H. K. Houston Meyer. His papers are held in the Jean and Alexander Heard Library Special Collections at Vanderbilt University.

Early life

Meyer was born to Wilhelm Meyer, a school teacher, and his wife Anna. He first enrolled at the university in Erlangen in 1923. In the same year he transferred to the University of Munich. From 1924 to 1928, Meyer studied in Freiburg, where he received his doctorate in German Literature. After teaching at Martin Luserke's Schule am Meer (School by the Sea) for two years, he then moved to Houston, Texas, where he lived for thirteen years as a German instructor at Rice Institute (today's Rice University (Werner 234–235). In 1935 Meyer applied for and received US Citizenship. On 10 May 1936, he married Mary Louise Dinsmoor who he had met at Rice Institute. He got divorced on 19 December 1942. On 19 February 1945, he married Doris Hoag Clark (* 1923). He got divorced from her in 1955. In 1957 he married a third time, Sibylle Hommel (* 1932).

Citizenship trial

Meyer took two trips to Germany shortly after naturalizing, in 1936 and again in 1938. A request he made for an audience with Adolf Hitler in 1938 was denied. Nevertheless, Meyer defended many practices in Nazi Germany to his American audiences by comparing them to Jim Crow policies in the American south. His German nationality brought him under suspicion of the FBI, who began to investigate his work. In September 1942, a petition to revoke Meyer's citizenship was filed in Houston, and Meyer had to serve as his own defense until attorneys Garvey W. Brown and William Hatten were hired for his case.

Academic career

Awards and prizes
 Award of Kant Society in Germany (1930)
 John Simon Guggenheim Fellowship (1953)
 Order of Merit of the Federal Republic of Germany (1972)

Publications
 Der deutsche Schäferroman (1928)
 Konrad Bäumlers weiter Weg: Ein Texas-deutscher Roman (1938) (as H.K. Houston Meyer)
 Goethe. Das Leben im Werk (1950 and 1952)
 The Age of the World: A Chapter in the History of the Enlightenment (1951)
 Was bleibt. Bemerkungen über Literatur und Leben, Schein und Wirklichkeit. (1966)
 Die Kunst des Erzählens (1972)

References

Rice University faculty
1904 births
1977 deaths
German emigrants to the United States
Officers Crosses of the Order of Merit of the Federal Republic of Germany